Epinotia ulmicola is a species of moth of the family Tortricidae. It is found in China (Guizhou, Shaanxi, Gansu), Korea, Japan and Russia.

The wingspan is 14–16 mm.

The larvae feed on Ulmus propinqua.

References

Moths described in 1993
Eucosmini